De Filippis or Defilippis is an Italian surname. Notable people with the surname include:

Daisy Cocco De Filippis (born 1949), Dominican-American writer and educator
Joseph DeFilippis (born 1967), American activist
Lodovico De Filippis (born 1915), Italian footballer
Maria Teresa de Filippis (1926–2016), Italian racing driver
Nino Defilippis (1932–2010), Italian cyclist
Nunzio DeFilippis, American writer
Roberto De Filippis (born 1988), Italian footballer

Italian-language surnames
Patronymic surnames
Surnames from given names